Lauren Cahoon Hamon (born January 20, 1985) is an Olympic-style Taekwondo martial artist. Lauren was a competitor in MTV2's Final Fu reality TV show, but dropped out after deciding that she didn't agree with the way sparring was being run.

Competition record (list)

 2006  Sr. National Team Trials (Heavy): 1st
 2005  U.S. Senior Nationals (Heavy): BRONZE
 2005  World University Games (Heavy): Quarterfinals
 2005  Collegiate Trials (Heavy): GOLD
 2005  World Championships (Heavy): Quarterfinals
 2005  Senior National Team Member (Heavy)
 2004  Canadian Open: SILVER
 2004  U.S. Senior Nationals: BRONZE
 2004  Belgium Open: SILVER
 2004  U.S. Open: BRONZE
 2003  Collegiate Nationals: GOLD
 2003  U.S. Senior Nationals: GOLD
 2002  Junior Olympics: GOLD
 2001  Junior Olympics: BRONZE

References

1985 births
Living people
Sportspeople from Jacksonville, Florida
American female taekwondo practitioners
Taekwondo practitioners at the 2007 Pan American Games
Taekwondo practitioners at the 2011 Pan American Games
Pan American Games medalists in taekwondo
Pan American Games bronze medalists for the United States
Medalists at the 2011 Pan American Games
21st-century American women